Ali Muhammad Khan (born 30 November 1977) is a Pakistani politician who served as the Minister of State for Parliamentary Affairs from 17 September 2018 to 10 April 2022. He is currently a member of the National Assembly of Pakistan since August 2018. By profession, he is an engineer and a law graduate.

His grandfather, Muhammad Wakeel, was a rigid supporter of the Muslim League and in 1940 he led the caravans from Mardan to attend the Lahore Resolution. Muhammad Wakeel was elected twice as a federal minister. He is also mutually respected among opposition  .

Early life and education
Khan was born on 30 November 1977 in a Pashtun family in Mardan.

Political career

He was elected to the National Assembly of Pakistan as a candidate of PTI from Constituency NA-10 (Mardan-II) in the 2013 Pakistani general election. He received 46,531 votes and defeated a candidate of JUI-F.

He was re-elected to the National Assembly as a candidate of PTI from the Constituency NA-22 (Mardan-III) in the 2018 Pakistani general election. He received 58,577 votes and defeated Moulana Mohammad Qasim.

On 17 September 2018, he was inducted into the federal cabinet of Prime Minister Imran Khan

Controversies
In 2014, a police case was registered against Khan after he stormed a police station which caused injuries to three policemen.

References

Living people
Pakistan Tehreek-e-Insaf politicians
Pashtun people
People from Mardan District
Pakistani MNAs 2013–2018
1977 births
Pakistani MNAs 2018–2023